Lawrence E. Blume is the Distinguished Arts and Sciences Professor of Economics and Professor of Information Science at Cornell University, US.

He is a visiting research professor at IHS Vienna  and a member of the external faculty at the Santa Fe Institute, where he has served as co-director of the economics program and on the institute's steering committee. He teaches and conducts research in general equilibrium theory and game theory, and also has research projects on natural resource management, network design, and evolutionary processes in markets and games. A Fellow of the Econometric Society, he received a BA in economics from Washington University in St. Louis and a PhD in economics from the University of California, Berkeley.

Blume was one of the general editors of The New Palgrave Dictionary of Economics, to which he contributed several articles on mathematical economics: Convexity, convex programming, and duality.  Currently he is the associate editor of the Journal of Economic Literature.

Selected publications

References

External links
 Larry Blume's Home Page
 
 

Cornell University faculty
Living people
Mathematical economists
21st-century American economists
Fellows of the Econometric Society
Santa Fe Institute people
Year of birth missing (living people)
Washington University in St. Louis alumni
UC Berkeley College of Letters and Science alumni